The Philippines is an archipelago of 7,107 islands with a land area of 300,000 square kilometers (115,831 square miles). Owing to its numerous islands, the country has an irregular coastline that stretches 334,539 kilometers (207,873 miles). It is surrounded by the Pacific Ocean on the east, the South China Sea on the north and the west and the Celebes Sea on the south.

The islands' rugged coastlines provide several bays and inlets listed below.

List 
 Note: Coordinates are sortable by latitude.

See also

 Geography of the Philippines
 Outline of the Philippines

Bays
Philippines
Pacific Ocean-related lists